PNS Badr (D-184) was the  that served in the Surface Command of the Pakistan Navy from 1994 until being decommissioned from the service in 2014.

Service history

Acquisition, construction, and modernization

She was designed and constructed by the Yarrow Shipbuilders, Ltd. at Glasgow in Scotland and was laid down on 5 March 1973; eventually, she was launched on 18 September 1974. During her service with the Royal Navy, she was notable for her wartime operations during the Falklands War with Argentina.

On 1 March 1994, she was purchased by Pakistan after the successful negotiation with the United Kingdom and sailed off from Port of Plymouth to the Port of Karachi, arriving on 26 June 1994.

Upon arriving in Karachi, she underwent an extensive modernization and mid-life upgrade program by the KSEW Ltd. at the Naval Base Karachi in 1998–2002.

In 2005, she was deployed to join the expeditionary strike group led by the U.S. Navy to engage in the relief efforts for the earthquake that struck the northern part of the Pakistan on 8 October 2005.

Her wartime performance included in deployments in patrolling off the Horn of Africa, Gulf of Oman, Persian Gulf, Arabian Sea, and Indian Ocean as part of the CTF-150.

In 2014, it was reported that PNS Badr was decommissioned from service.

Gallery

References

External links

1974 ships
Tariq-class destroyers
Ships built in Pakistan
2005 Kashmir earthquake